The Play-offs of the 2010 Fed Cup Europe/Africa Zone Group III were the final stages of the Group III Zonal Competition involving teams from Europe and Africa. Using the positions determined in their pools, the seven teams faced off to determine their placing in the 2010 Fed Cup Europe/Africa Zone Group III. The top two teams advanced to Group II for next year.

Promotion play-offs
The top two teams of each pool were placed against each other in two head-to-head rounds. The winner of the rounds advanced to Group II for next year.

Turkey vs. Algeria

Egypt vs. Morocco

Fifth to Sixth play-off
The third placed teams of both pools were placed against each other in a head-to-head rounds. The winner of the round was allocated fifth place in the Group, while the loser was allocated sixth.

Moldova vs. Ireland

Seventh
Due to the fact that there was an odd number of teams in Pool A as opposed to the even number of teams in Pool B, the nation that placed last in Pool B was automatically allocated seventh place in Group III.

Final Placements

  and  advanced to Group II for 2011. They both placed third in their respective pools, and thus met in the relegation play-off. The Turks won, meaning Turkey remained in Group II, while Morocco was relegated back to Group III for 2012.

See also
Fed Cup structure

References

External links
 Fed Cup website

2010 Fed Cup Europe/Africa Zone